Strömmen may refer to:

Strømmen, a town in Norway.
Stockholms ström, a part of the Saltsjön bay of the Baltic Sea, in Sweden.